Allen Lee Davis (July 20, 1944 – July 8, 1999) was an American murderer who was executed for the May 11, 1982, murder of Nancy Weiler, who was three months pregnant, in Jacksonville, Florida. According to reports, Nancy Weiler was "beaten almost beyond recognition" by Davis with a .357 Magnum, and hit more than 25 times in the face and head. He was additionally convicted of killing Nancy Weiler's two daughters, Kristina, age 9, who was shot twice in the face, and Katherine, age 5, who was shot as she tried to run away and then had her skull beaten in with the gun. 

Davis, who had a lengthy criminal history, was on parole for armed robbery at the time of the murders. He later admitted that his initial motive was to rape and murder Kristina, kill her sister and mother, and then ransack the house.

Davis was executed on July 8, 1999, via electrocution. His execution was alleged to have been botched, with witnesses reporting that Davis was still alive after the power to Old Sparky was switched off. Blood had also leaked from Davis's nose during the execution, although prison officials alleged this was caused by a nose bleed. 

Because of the controversy surrounding his execution, Davis remains the last person executed by electric chair in Florida. All subsequent executions in Florida have been carried out by lethal injection, although inmates can still choose to be executed by electric chair.

Earlier crimes 
Davis had prior convictions for armed robbery, attempted armed robbery, use of a firearm during the commission of a felony, and involuntary manslaughter. He also had a history of child molestation. Nancy Weiler's husband, John Weiler, would later call Davis a "deviant animal that should have been permanently caged or executed many years before May 1982."

Execution

Last meal

Electrical parameters
According to the licensed electrical engineer who managed the equipment, the amount of electrical energy applied to Davis in three steps was:

 1,500 Volts, 10 Amperes, 150 Ohms, for 8 seconds  (power = 15.0 kilowatts (kW), energy = 120 kilojoules (kJ))
 600 Volts, 4.5 Amperes, 133 Ohms, for 22 seconds  (power = 2.7 kW, energy = 59.4 kJ)
 1,500 Volts, 10 Amperes, 150 Ohms, for 8 seconds  (power = 15.0 kW, energy = 120 kJ)

The maximum power was 15.0 kW, which is approximately equal to 11.2 horsepower.  The maximum output of a standard U.S. 15 Ampere electrical outlet is 1.8 kW  or 1.3 horsepower. 

The total energy used was 299.4 kJ or 284 British thermal units (BTU), over a period of 38 seconds.

A BTU is defined as the amount of heat required to raise the temperature of one pound of water by one degree Fahrenheit.  Davis weighed 350 pounds.  284 BTUs are the amount of heat needed to raise 350 pounds of water 0.8 degrees Fahrenheit.  An average male body contains about 58 ±8% water.

Controversy
Davis's execution gained nationwide media attention after he bled profusely from the nose while being electrocuted. Also during his time in the electric chair, Davis suffered burns to his head, leg, and groin area. 

A subsequent investigation concluded that Davis had begun bleeding before the first jolt of electricity was applied. He had been taking blood thinning medication for an unrelated health problem. It was concluded that the electric chair had functioned as designed and the Florida Supreme Court upheld electrocution as a means of capital punishment. However, a dissenting justice published photos of the aftermath of the incident in an attempt to argue that the practice of capital punishment by electrocution was outdated, and that any future executions should be carried out through lethal injection. 

In 1999, the state of Florida heard a petition from Thomas Harrison Provenzano, another death row inmate, arguing that the electric chair was a "cruel and unusual punishment". As of 2021, Davis was the last Florida inmate executed by electric chair. Since the 2000 execution of Terry Melvin Sims, all subsequent executions were by lethal injection. Inmates, however, may still choose electrocution. As of 2023, only Wayne C. Doty has opted for death by electrocution; he is still alive, and his execution date has yet to be set.

See also
 Capital punishment in Florida
 Capital punishment in the United States
 List of botched executions
 List of people executed in Florida

References

External links
 DC.State.fl.us, Inmate Release Information Detail - Inmate 040174. Florida Department of Corrections. Retrieved on 2008-05-29.
 DC.State.fl.us, August 3, 1999 Order Upholding Constitutionality of the Electric Chair. Florida Department of Corrections (1999-08-03). Retrieved on 2008-05-29.

1944 births
1999 deaths
20th-century executions by Florida
1982 murders in the United States
American murderers of children
American robbers
20th-century executions of American people
People convicted of murder by Florida
People executed by Florida by electric chair
Executed people from Florida
American male criminals
Male murderers
Violence against women in the United States